The following Confederate Army units and commanders fought in the Battle of Jonesborough of the American Civil War on August 31-September 1, 1864. The Union order of battle is listed separately.

See also: Atlanta Campaign Confederate order of battle (Second Phase) and Atlanta Confederate order of battle.

Abbreviations used

Military rank
MG = Major General
BG = Brigadier General
Col = Colonel
Ltc = Lieutenant Colonel
Maj = Major
Cpt = Captain
Lt = Lieutenant

Other
w = wounded
mw = mortally wounded
k = killed

Army of Tennessee
LTG William J. Hardee

Hardee's Corps
MG Patrick R. Cleburne

Lee's Corps 
LTG Stephen D. Lee

Notes

References
 "Battle of Jonesboro," Civil War Trust <http://www.civilwar.org/battlefields/atlanta/atlanta-history-articles/battle-of-jonesboro.html> 20 April 2016.
 "Jonesboro," Tenth Kentucky Volunteer Infantry <https://web.archive.org/web/20160307213211/http://tenthkentuckyinfantry.com/jonesboro.php> 20 April 2016.
 "Jonesboro," National Park Service <https://www.nps.gov/civilwar/search-battles-detail.htm?battleCode=GA022> 20 April 2016.
 U.S. War Department, The War of the Rebellion: a Compilation of the Official Records of the Union and Confederate Armies. Washington, DC: U.S. Government Printing Office, 1880–1901.

American Civil War orders of battle
Atlanta campaign